Tesco Direct was a shopping catalogue and website operated by the British supermarket chain and retailer Tesco. It supplied non-food goods such as homeware and consumer products with delivery or in-store collection through collection points in Tesco stores. It was run in competition with Argos and Amazon. The final catalogue was published and printed in 2012.

It opened in 2006 and ceased trading on 9 July 2018. When it closed it employed around 500 people. Tesco described the loss-making service as having “no route to profitability” when announcing the closure. Citing high costs of marketing and fulfillment for the service as responsible for the failure.

References

Tesco
Retail companies established in 2006
Internet properties established in 2006
Retail companies disestablished in 2018
Retail companies of the United Kingdom
British brands
2006 establishments in the United Kingdom
British companies established in 2006